= Entsuji =

Entsuji may refer to

- 4272 Entsuji, a main-belt asteroid
- Entsu-ji, a temple in Kyoto
